Jim Svejda (born 1947) is an American music commentator and critic, born and raised in Chicago, on the Los Angeles FM radio station KUSC. He hosted the station's local week-nightly classical series The Evening Program, until retiring on February 18, 2022. From 1983 he hosted the Sunday night syndicated classical music program The Record Shelf,. He also hosted the now-cancelled series The Opera Box.

He opened The Evening Program with the third movement from Piano Quartet No. 1 by Bohuslav Martinů.The Record Shelf featured items such as interviews with classical music notables, surveys of different recordings of a classical music piece, monthly critical surveys of recently released recordings, and noted, often rare historical recordings of great performers of the past. Svejda was praised for his articulate commentaries on these programs.

Svejda is considered by many to be refreshingly frank and subjective in his opinions. In his published Record Shelf Guide, Svejda himself describes the book as "an irreverent, selective and highly opinionated recordings guide of the best classical CDs and audiocassettes." He often has viewpoints that might be considered divergent from those of many other music critics.

While admitting that they sometimes have turned out excellent recordings, Svejda has been critical of such illustrious musicians as Vladimir Horowitz and Arturo Toscanini, as well as Herbert von Karajan (whom he has excoriated for his Nazi past) and especially Nikolaus Harnoncourt, whom Svejda has called an "incompetent bozo." He tends to favor conductors and musicians who do not follow a printed musical score literally, and his guidebook, The Record Shelf Guide to the Classical Repertoire, often will recommend a controversial recording of a piece (such as Sir Thomas Beecham's 1959 recording of Handel's Messiah), alongside a more traditional one.

Svejda is also an occasional film critic, with his reviews syndicated on the CBS Radio Network. After 43 years at KUSC, Svejda announced his retirement. His last show was Friday, February 18th, 2022. Svejda's replacement, KUSC Resident Artist Lara Downes was announced as his successor on March 18, 2022.

References

American music critics
Classical music radio presenters
American radio personalities
1947 births
Living people